Dărmănești is a town in eastern Romania, in Bacău County, in the valleys of the Trotuș and Uz rivers. The town is named after one of its leaders, "Dărman" and the earliest reference to the town is from the 16th century. As of 2011, it has a population of 12,247. It officially became a town in 1989, as a result of the Romanian rural systematization program.

The town administers five villages: Dărmăneasca, Lapoș, Păgubeni, Plopu and Sălătruc.

Natives
Relu Fenechiu

References

External links

 www.darmanesti.home.ro

Populated places in Bacău County
Localities in Western Moldavia
Towns in Romania